Robert Puleston (by 1526 – 15 August 1583) was a Welsh politician.

He was the eldest surviving son of Sir John Puleston of Caernarvon and Bersham, who was MP for Caernarvon and Caernarvonshire. He succeeded his father in 1551.

He was a Justice of the Peace for Denbighshire in 1555–61, Justice of the Peace of the Quorum from 1562 until his death, and appointed High Sheriff of Denbighshire for 1558-59 and 1569–70. He was also High Sheriff of Montgomeryshire for 1571-72 and from 1573 to his death a J.P. for Caernarvonshire.

He was elected a Member (MP) of the Parliament of England for Caernarvon Boroughs in 1547 and for Denbighshire in March 1553 and 1571.

He married Ellen, the daughter of William Williams of Cochwillan, Caernarvonshire; they had 6 sons and 2 daughters.

References

 

1583 deaths
16th-century Welsh politicians
Members of the Parliament of England (pre-1707) for constituencies in Wales
English MPs 1547–1552
English MPs 1553 (Edward VI)
English MPs 1571
High Sheriffs of Denbighshire
High Sheriffs of Montgomeryshire
Year of birth uncertain
Members of Parliament for Caernarfon